Ballynanny (Annaclone) is a townland of 538 acres in County Down, Northern Ireland. It is situated in the civil parish of Annaclone and the historic barony of Iveagh Upper, Upper Half.

There is a townland of the same name in the civil parish of Clonduff in the historic barony of Iveagh Upper, Lower Half.

References

Townlands of County Down
Civil parish of Annaclone